Guariba River is a river of Amazonas state in western Brazil. It is a tributary of the Pauini River, which itself is indirectly a tributary of the Rio Negro.

See also
List of rivers of Amazonas

References
Brazilian Ministry of Transport

Rivers of Amazonas (Brazilian state)